Rick Carriere (born March 14, 1959) is a Canadian former professional ice hockey defenceman. He is currently the Senior Director of Player Development for the Edmonton Oilers of the National Hockey League (NHL).

Carriere played professionally during the 1979-80 season with the Hampton Aces and Johnstown Red Wings of the Eastern Hockey League, scoring one goal and four assists, with 34 penalty minutes, in 46 games played.

In 1981, Carriere enrolled with the University of Alberta where he played four years with the Alberta Golden Bears. After graduating with a Bachelor of Education, he began his coaching career in 1985 as an assistant coach with the Northern Alberta Institute of Technology hockey program, becoming head coach in 1989.

Carriere was an assistant coach with the Saint John Flames of the American Hockey League from 1992 to 1994, before moving to the Western Hockey League where he was the head coach of the Red Deer Rebels from 1994 to 1996, and of the Medicine Hat Tigers from 1996 until 2000 when he became the team's General Manager. He remained GM until 2004, and stayed with the Tigers as a scout until 2012.

On June 28, 2012, Carriere was named the Senior Director of Player Development for the Edmonton Oilers of the National Hockey League.

References

External links

1959 births
Living people
Alberta Golden Bears ice hockey players
Canadian ice hockey coaches
Canadian ice hockey defencemen
Edmonton Oilers personnel
Fort Saskatchewan Traders players
Hampton Aces players
Johnstown Red Wings players
Medicine Hat Tigers coaches
Red Deer Rebels coaches
Saskatoon Blades players
Ice hockey people from Edmonton